Jarl Eriksen (born January 15, 1964) is a former Norwegian ice hockey player. He was born in Oslo, Norway. He played for the Norwegian national ice hockey team at the 1988 Winter Olympics.

References

External links
 

1964 births
Living people
Ice hockey players at the 1988 Winter Olympics
Norwegian ice hockey players
Olympic ice hockey players of Norway
Ice hockey people from Oslo